Russell County is a county in the southeastern part of the U.S. state of Alabama. As of the 2020 census, the population was 59,183. Its county seat is Phenix City. Its name is in honor of Colonel Gilbert C. Russell, who fought in the wars against the Creek Indians.

Russell County is part of the Columbus, GA-AL Metropolitan Statistical Area.

Of all counties in the United States, Russell County has the most amount of people working in a state other than their own, at over 54% of the population, most of whom work in Columbus, Georgia.

History
Russell County was established by an act of the state general assembly on December 18, 1832, from lands ceded to the state by the Creek Native Americans. The county seat has changed several times: Girard (1833–1839), Crawford originally Crockettsville (1839–1868), Seale (1868–1935) and Phenix City (1935–present). It was named for War of 1812, Col. Gilbert Christian Russell Sr., 1782–1861, 3rd U.S. Infantry.

In the 1940s and 1950s, Russell County and especially its county seat, Phenix City gained a reputation of lawlessness, political corruption and being a den for vice such as organized crime, prostitution, and gambling.  The city police and county deputies also took part in the corruption. In 1954, the local politician Albert Patterson won the Democratic nomination for Alabama Attorney General on a platform of ridding the city of corruption and crime. Patterson ran for a state office since he was unable to run in local elections, as they were rigged. On June 18, 1954, Patterson was shot and killed by an unknown assassin. The murder set off a series of events that led to Governor Gordon Persons declaring martial law in the county and city because of its lawlessness on July 22 that year. That was the only time since the Reconstruction era that martial law was declared in a US city for reasons other than civil unrest or natural disaster. The Alabama National Guard was called in to assume the role of the police and clean up the area of illegal activities. The state of martial law was rescinded on January 17, 1955, with Russell County and Phenix City both returning to civilian control. In 1974, the New York Times noted that the campaign as very successful and led to a relatively-low crime rate in Phenix City for the 20 years since then.

Geography
The county is located in the Gulf Coastal Plain region, with a few rolling hills due to its close proximity to the fall line of the eastern United States.

Major highways

 U.S. Highway 80
 U.S. Highway 280
 U.S. Highway 431
 State Route 26
 State Route 51
 State Route 165
 State Route 169
 State Route 208

Adjacent counties
Lee County (north)
Muscogee County, Georgia (northeast/EST Border)
Chattahoochee County, Georgia (east/EST Border)
Stewart County, Georgia (southeast/EST Border)
Barbour County (south)
Bullock County (southwest)
Macon County (northwest)

National protected area
 Eufaula National Wildlife Refuge (part)

Demographics

2020 census

As of the 2020 United States census, there were 59,183 people, 23,262 households, and 14,948 families residing in the county.

2010 census
As of the 2010 United States census, there were 52,947 people living in the county. 53.7% were White, 41.8% Black or African American, 0.4% Asian, 0.4% Native American, 0.2% Pacific Islander, 1.3% of some other race and 2.1% of two or more races. 3.7% were Hispanic or Latino (of any race).

2000 census
As of the census of 2000, there were 49,756 people, 19,741 households, and 13,423 families living in the county. There were 22,831 housing units, at an average density of 14/km2 (36/sq mi). The racial makeup of the county was: 56.69% White, 40.84% Black or African American, 0.37% Native American, 0.36% Asian, 0.07% Pacific Islander, 0.59% from other races, and 1.07% from two or more races. Nearly 1.50% of the population were Hispanic or Latino of any race.

There were 19,741 households, out of which 32.00% had children under the age of 18 living with them; 44.40% were married couples living together, 18.90% had a female householder with no husband present, and 32.00% were non-families. 28.00% of all households were made up of individuals, and 10.60% had someone living alone who was 65 years of age or older.  The average household size was 2.49, and the average family size was 3.05.

In the county, the population was spread out, with 26.50% under the age of 18, 9.10% from 18 to 24, 28.80% from 25 to 44, 22.40% from 45 to 64, and 13.10% who were 65 years of age or older.  The median age was 35 years. For every 100 females, there were 91.00 males.  For every 100 females age 18 and over, there were 85.90 males.

The median income for a household in the county was $27,492, and the median income for a family was $34,004. Males had a median income of $28,696 versus $20,882 for females. The per capita income for the county was $14,015.  About 16.80% of families and 19.90% of the population were below the poverty line, including 26.50% of those under age 18 and 19.30% of those age 65 or over.

Government
Russell County trends Democratic in presidential elections; having last supported a Republican in 1972 when it voted for President Nixon. President Bush came within 38 votes of carrying the county in 2004.

Communities

City
Phenix City (county seat; partly in Lee County)

Town
Hurtsboro

Census-designated place
Ladonia

Unincorporated communities

Cottonton
Crawford
Fort Mitchell
Glenville
Hatchechubbee
Holy Trinity
Hooks
Jernigan
Pittsview
Seale
Uchee
Wende

Former City
Girard (merged with Phenix City in 1923)

Notable person
James Abercrombie, United States Congressman from Alabama, resided here.

See also
National Register of Historic Places listings in Russell County, Alabama
Properties on the Alabama Register of Landmarks and Heritage in Russell County, Alabama

References

Sources

External links
 Official Russell County website 
 Russell County map of roads/towns (map © 2007 Univ. of Alabama).
 Columbus Enquirer Archive Digital Library of Georgia

 
Columbus metropolitan area, Georgia
1832 establishments in Alabama
Populated places established in 1832
Majority-minority counties in Alabama